The Albanian Bishops' Conference (KISH) is an episcopal conference of the Catholic Church in Albania. The conference is organized by Archbishop Angelo Massafra, Archbishop and Metropolitan of Shkodrë-Pult conducted. It is a member of the Council of European Episcopal Conferences (CCEE).

Members

Angelo Massafra OFM, Archbishop of Shkodrë-Pult
George Anthony Frendo OP, Archbishop of Tiranë-Durrës
Cristoforo Palmieri CM, Bishop Emeritus of Rrëshen
Giovanni Peragine, Apostolic Administrator of Southern Albania
Ottavio Vitale RCJ, Bishop of Lezhë
 Simon Kulli, Bishop of Sape

See also

Roman Catholicism in Albania
Mother Teresa

References

External links
 Official website

Albania
Catholic Church in Albania